Szydłów is a village (formerly a town) in Świętokrzyskie Voivodeship, south-central Poland.

Szydłów may also refer to:
Polish name for Šiluva in Lithuania
Szydłów, Pabianice County in Łódź Voivodeship (central Poland)
Szydłów, Piotrków County in Łódź Voivodeship (central Poland)
Szydłów, Lubusz Voivodeship (west Poland)
Szydłów, Opole Voivodeship (south-west Poland)